Raising Race Questions: Whiteness and Inquiry in Education: Raising Race Questions is a 2014 book about race and ethnicity in the United States by Ali Michael.

Overview
Raising Race Questions explores challenges and opportunities that arise when White teachers deal with race and how it functions in their classrooms.

References

External links
Teachers College Press

2014 non-fiction books
American non-fiction books
Books about race and ethnicity
English-language books
Works about White Americans